We All Think We're Special is a 2021 American thriller film co-written, and directed by Kirby Voss. It stars Jared Bankens, and William McGovern. The film was released on DVD and digital platforms by Cinema Epoch on June 4, 2021.

Plot
The plot revolves around two childhood friends, Charlie (Jared Bankens) and Ed (William McGovern), who have a night of reckless drinking. The next morning, Ed decides that Charlie must go through detox, no matter the cost.

Cast
 Jared Bankens as Charlie
 William McGovern as Ed
 Eli Barron as Teen Charlie
 Caleb Caldcleugh as Teen Ed

References

External links

2021 films
2021 thriller films
American thriller films
2020s English-language films
2020s American films